The participation of Serbia in the Junior Eurovision Song Contest first began in Bucharest, Romania at the Junior Eurovision Song Contest 2006, having previously participated in  as part of . Radio Television of Serbia (RTS) a member organisation of the European Broadcasting Union (EBU) are responsible for the selection process of its entrants.

In 2007, the country was represented by Nevena Božović, who went on to represent Serbia in the Eurovision Song Contest 2013 as part of the girl group Moje 3. Serbia returned to the competition in  represented by Emilija Đonin, who was selected internally by the national broadcaster RTS, a selection mechanism that it continued to use in 2015 when it internally selected the song "Lenina pesma", performed by Lena Stamenković.

History

Prior to the Montenegrin independence referendum in 2006 which culminated into the dissolution of Serbia and Montenegro, both nations use to compete at the Junior Eurovision Song Contest and Eurovision Song Contest as Serbia and Montenegro. Serbia were the first of the two nations to compete at a Junior Contest, making its debut at the Junior Eurovision Song Contest 2006. While it was at the Junior Eurovision Song Contest 2014 when  would make its debut as an independent nation. Neustrašivi učitelji stranih jezika went on to being Serbia's first participant in 2006 as an independent nation with the song "Učimo strane jezike".

Serbia continued to participate at the Junior Eurovision Song Contest 2007, in which it had selected Nevena Božović to represent Serbia with the song "Piši mi". Božović also became the first Junior Eurovision participant to take part in the senior Eurovision Song Contest as part of the group Moje 3, performing the song "Ljubav je svuda", which achieved forty-six points and failing to qualify to the grand final of the Eurovision Song Contest 2013 after finishing in 11th place. However, she managed to qualify in the grand final of the Eurovision Song Contest 2019 with the song "Kruna" and finished in 18th place with 89 points.

The nation continued to participate at every Junior Contest until , which would be its last appearance at that present time, following the broadcaster's announcement on 5 June 2011 that Serbia would withdraw from the  contest. On 25 July 2014, Serbia announced its return to the  contest, after a three-year absence. Serbia selected its 2014 entry through an internal selection for the first time in its history. On 1 October 2014 it was revealed that Emilija Đonin would represent Serbia in the contest with the song "Svet u mojim očima".

On 4 May 2015, it was announced on a Eurovision news website that Serbia's national broadcaster, RTS, had not started any planning in regards to their participation at the  contest, and that such decision would be taken after the Eurovision Song Contest 2015. On 20 August 2015, Serbia confirmed its participation. RTS announced on 21 September 2015, that they had internally selected Lena Stamenković with the song "Lenina pesma" to represent them at the Junior Eurovision Song Contest 2015, which took place at the Arena Armeec, in the Bulgarian capital Sofia, on 21 November 2015. On 14 September 2016, Serbia confirmed its participation in the Junior Eurovision Song Contest 2016 in Valletta, Malta.

Participation overview

Commentators and spokespersons

The table below list the details of each commentator and spokesperson since 2006.

Gallery

See also
Serbia in the Eurovision Song Contest – Senior version of the Eurovision Song Contest.
Serbia in the Eurovision Young Musicians – A competition organised by the EBU for musicians aged 18 years and younger.
Sandžak in the Turkvision Song Contest – A historical geo-political region, now divided by the border between Serbia and Montenegro, which competes under the name Sandžak in a contest for countries and regions which are of Turkic-speaking or Turkic ethnicity.

References 

 
Serbia
Junior Eurovision Song Contest